"One Great Thing" is the third single from Scottish band Big Country's 1986 album, The Seer. The composition of the song and in particular the guitar solo appears to feature similar melody from the chorus of Bonnie Banks O' Loch Lomond. After the somewhat disappointing chart performance of the band's previous single "The Teacher" (UK No. 28), the song reached No. 19 in the UK Singles Chart.

A music video was also shot for the song, featuring different people mouthing the lyrics to the song as well as shots of the group performing it on stage.

Tennent's Lager used a modified version of the "One Great Thing" video and song in the 1980s.

The song was used at the launch, on 25 May 2012, of the Yes Scotland campaign for the Scottish independence referendum due to be held in Autumn 2014.

Chart positions

References

1986 singles
Big Country songs
Songs written by Stuart Adamson
Songs written by Tony Butler (musician)
Rock ballads